Digging for the Truth was a History Channel television series. The first three seasons of the show focused on host Josh Bernstein, who was replaced by Hunter Ellis.

Episodes

Season One
 Who Built Egypt's Pyramids?
 Pompeii Secrets Revealed
 Hunt for the Lost Ark
 The Holy Grail
 The Iceman Cometh
 Quest for King Solomon's Gold
 Passage to the Maya Underworld
 The Lost Tribe of Israel
 Secrets of the Nazca Lines
 The Search for El Dorado
 Giants of Easter Island
 Mystery of the Anasazi
 Nefertiti: The Mummy Returns

Season Two
 The Real Temple of Doom
 America's Pyramids
 Stonehenge Secrets Revealed
 The Vikings: Voyage to America
 Roanoke: The Lost Colony
 Cleopatra: The Last Pharaoh
 City of the Gods - Teotihuacan
 The Real Queen of Sheba
 Troy: Of Gods and Warriors
 The Da Vinci Code: Bloodlines
 The Giants of Patagonia
 The Real Sin City: Sodom and Gomorrah
 The Lost Cities of the Amazon

Season Three
 Atlantis: New Revelations 2-hour Special
 Lost Empire Of Genghis Khan
 King Tut Secrets Revealed
 New Maya Revelations
 Ramesses II: Visions of Greatness
 Machu Picchu
 Secrets of Mummies
 Lost Treasures of Petra
 Stonehenge of the Americas (Tiwanaku)
 Lost Treasures of the Copper Scroll
 The Aztecs
 Searching for King David

Season Four
 Mummies of the Clouds
 The Hunley: New Revelations
 Kings of the Stone Age
 Pirates: Terror in the Mediterranean
 God's Gold, Part 1
 God's Gold, Part 2
 Timbuktu
 Angkor Wat: Eighth Wonder of the World

Digging for the Truth